Dola Hill Stadium is a multi-use stadium in Ndola, Zambia.  It is currently used mostly for football matches and serves as the home for Forest Rangers Football Club.  The stadium holds 2300 people. It is located in a township called Dola Hill.

Football venues in Zambia
Ndola
Buildings and structures in Copperbelt Province